VA, Va and variants may refer to:

Places
 Vä, Sweden, a village
 Vatican City (ISO 3166-1 country code VA)
 Virginia, United States postal abbreviation

Businesses and organizations

Businesses
 VA Software (also known as "VA Research" and "VA Linux Systems") a company that eventually became Geeknet
 VA Tech Wabag, a company with headquarters in Austria and India
 Virgin Atlantic, a worldwide airline owned by Richard Branson of the Virgin group
 Virgin Australia (IATA code since 2011)
 V Australia (IATA code 2009–2011)
 Viasa (IATA code 1960–1997)

Organizations
 United States Department of Veterans Affairs, a department of the US government
 VA (Public & Science), Swedish scientific organisation
 Vermont Academy, boarding and day high school in Saxtons River, VT
 VA, post nominal letters of the Royal Order of Victoria and Albert
 VA, nickname for the French association football club Valenciennes FC
 Virtual airline (hobby), flight simulation hobby organization
 Voluntary aided school, type of state-funded school in England and Wales

Media and entertainment 
 Va (film), a 2010 Tamil-language movie
 Vampire Academy, series of 6 best-selling books
 Victoria & Albert Museum, more usually given as "V&A"
 Violent Apathy, punk rock band from Kalamazoo, MI
 Virtual Adepts, a "tradition" in the role-playing game Mage: The Ascension
 Virtual Analog, musical instruments that emulate analog synthesizers
 Visual arts
 Voice actor, actor who provides voices for animated characters or non-visual media

Science, technology, and mathematics

Biology and medicine
 Valproic acid, an often-used anticonvulsant and mood-stabilizing drug
 Vascular anomaly, in medicine
 Ventral anterior nucleus, a component of the thalamus in the central nervous system
 Ventricular arrhythmia
 Visual acuity, a quantitative measure of visual perception

Computing and systems
 .va, the country code top level domain (ccTLD) for the State of the Vatican City
 Validation Authority, in public key infrastructure
 Virtual address, a computer memory location in virtual address space
 Vertical alignment, a technology used in a modern liquid-crystal display
 Visual analytics, business intelligence visualization tools
 Vulnerability assessment, the process of identifying and quantifying vulnerabilities in a system

Mathematics and physics
 Vertex algebra
 Vertical asymptote, in mathematics
 Volt-ampere, the SI unit of apparent power measurement, equivalent to the watt

Space and aviation
 VA, the design maneuvering speed of an aircraft
 Vozvraschaemyi Apparat or VA spacecraft, a Soviet reentry vehicle

Other uses
 Various Artists, used in the description of a music album which contains tracks that have been compiled from several different artists
 Va people, an ethnic group in China and Myanmar
 Value added, in economics
 Variable annuity, a financial instrument
 Vice admiral, a military rank
 Virtual assistant, an independent contractor providing assistance to clients via the internet
 Volatile acidity or vinegar taint, high acetic acidity in wine
 Amateur radio callsign prefix for Canada, e.g. as in "VA1BOB"
Vá (footballer), Angolan footballer